Group 7 of the UEFA Euro 1976 qualifying tournament was one of the eight groups to decide which teams would qualify for the UEFA Euro 1976 finals tournament. Group 7 consisted of four teams: Belgium, East Germany, France, and Iceland, where they played against each other home-and-away in a round-robin format. The group winners were Belgium, who finished one point above East Germany.

Final table

Matches

 (*)NOTE: Attendance also reported as 30,000

Goalscorers

References
 
 
 

Group 7
1974–75 in Belgian football
1975–76 in Belgian football
1974–75 in East German football
1975–76 in East German football
1974–75 in French football
1975–76 in French football
1974 in Icelandic football
1975 in Icelandic football